Vilmos Halpern (12 February 1910 – 27 September 1969) was a Hungarian football player and manager who managed Dutch side Ajax between 1940 and 1941, before moving to Dutch amateur side NOAD.

He later managed a number of club sides in Switzerland - FC Grenchen (1951) and AC Bellinzona (1955–1956).

Personal life
Vilmos was born in Budapest, to Sara Izrael and Chaim Wolf Halpern. He was married to Antje Postma.

References

1910 births
1969 deaths
Footballers from Budapest
Hungarian footballers
Hungarian football managers
Alemannia Aachen managers
AFC Ajax managers
AC Bellinzona managers
SVV Scheveningen managers
Hungarian expatriate football managers
Hungarian expatriate sportspeople in Germany
Expatriate football managers in Germany
Hungarian expatriate sportspeople in the Netherlands
Expatriate football managers in the Netherlands
Hungarian expatriate sportspeople in Switzerland
Expatriate football managers in Switzerland
Association footballers not categorized by position